Zoétgomdé is a village in the Soaw Department of Boulkiemdé Province in central western Burkina Faso. It has a population of 721.

References

Populated places in Boulkiemdé Province